The Infinity or 300 Spear Street is a mixed-use residential condominium development in the Rincon Hill neighborhood of San Francisco, California consisting of 2 high-rise towers and 2 low-rise buildings. The four buildings contain 650 residential units.  The complex is the first phase of a massive residential development encompassing two city blocks.

History
The two residential projects, 300 Spear and 201 Folsom, were proposed by Tishman Speyer Properties and initially designed by Heller Manus Architects. The San Francisco Planning Commission was scheduled to give its vote on the two projects on June 26, 2003, but this was delayed until September. Eventually, the two projects were given approval by the Planning Commission in spite of heavy opposition. However, 300 Spear and 201 Folsom still needed approval from the San Francisco Board of Supervisors in order for the project to progress. A few months later, the Board of Supervisors gave initial approval to the projects. The project was given final approval by San Francisco's Board of Supervisors on February 4, 2004.

Description

Overview
The residential complex consists of four buildings with one 8 and one 9-story midrise, and 37 and 42-story highrise towers. The highrise towers are named The Infinity I and The Infinity II. One of the towers, the Infinity I, rises  and contain 37 floors. The taller highrise, the Infinity II, rises   and contain 42 floors. The 650-unit complex containing these four buildings is bounded by Main Street to the southwest, Folsom Street to the northwest and Spear Street to the northeast. The complex is one block inland from the Embarcadero and the San Francisco Bay. Pricing for the units range from $700,000-$5 million.

Design
300 Spear was originally designed by San Francisco's Heller Manus Architects.  The 820-unit complex featured a garden on top of the midrise towers and all four buildings were connected together. Later, the developer decided to hire Arquitectonica to revamp the design of 300 Spear along with Heller Manus Architects. The four buildings of the complex were split apart and the sky gardens were gone. In addition, the complex had its color changed to a blue-green color which adapted a simplified concrete structure with curving walls of glass curtain wall and metal. The number of units was also reduced from 820 to 650 before construction of 300 Spear began.

Impact
The highrise towers rise above the earlier buildings in between the Embarcadero waterfront and Spear Street, making the complex prominent from places like the San Francisco Bay. Along with the Millennium Tower and One Rincon Hill to the west and south, respectively, they will create a new highrise neighborhood in the South of Market district.

Buried ship discovery
Construction started in April, 2005 when a surface parking lot was demolished to make way for the complex. The buried ship was later identified as the 1818 whaling ship The Candace.

Notes
A. The SkyscraperPage.com 300 Spear and San Francisco Project Rundown threads state The Infinity I is 400 feet (122 m) tall, as opposed to 450 feet (137 m). Source. Source.

See also

List of tallest buildings in San Francisco

References

External links

 Official Website

Residential buildings in San Francisco
Residential skyscrapers in San Francisco
Financial District, San Francisco
South of Market, San Francisco
2000s architecture in the United States
2000s in San Francisco
2008 establishments in California
Arquitectonica buildings